MV Sound of Soay is a car and passenger ferry, operated by Western Ferries on the upper Clyde between Gourock and Dunoon, Scotland.

History
Sound of Soay was built entirely in the UK by Cammell Laird of Birkenhead. She was launched/ craned into the River Mersey on 22 July 2013, the first complete ship from the yard since 1992. After fitting out, she entered service in October 2013.

Layout
Sound of Soay and her sister,  were a development of the design of the earlier fleet members. They have a single car deck with 194 lane-metres and bow and stern ramps. There is a passenger lounge. The ferries utilise LED lighting and enhanced heat recovery.

Service
Along with up to three other vessels, Sound of Soay operates Western Ferries Clyde service between McInroy's Point (Gourock) and Hunters Quay (Dunoon). This 2.2 nautical mile crossing allows vehicles to avoid the A83 "Rest and be thankful".

References

External links

2013 ships
Ferries of Scotland